Aditya Sahu  is an  Indian politician and a member of the Rajya Sabha, upper house of the Parliament of India from Jharkhand as a member of the Bharatiya Janata Party.

Early life
He was born in Kuchu village of Ormanjhi of Ranchi district in state of Jharkhand. He is  son of late Chatur Sahu and Daulat Devi. His two elder brother are Kaleswar Sahu and Meghnath Sahu. He had studied M.Com. He married Lalita Devi. He has one daughter and one son. He belongs to Teli community.

Career
He was professor of Ram Tahal Chaudhary College till 2019. He is member of BJP since two decades. He was leader of state BJP unit from 2019. In 2022, he was elected as a member of Rajya Sabha.

References

Bharatiya Janata Party politicians from Jharkhand
Living people
Year of birth missing (living people)
Rajya Sabha members from Jharkhand
People from Ranchi district
Nagpuria people